World Netball's Americas region includes North America, South America, Central America and the Caribbean. The region covers 54 nations, of which 15 have national governing bodies as of 2021. Each year, the region hosts two tournaments: the CNA U16 Championship and the AFNA Senior Championship. World Netball was formerly called the "International Netball Federation" or INF.

Netball is most popular in Commonwealth countries, such as Antigua and Barbuda and Grenada. As of August 2016, several teams in the region ranked amongst the top thirty-five in the world, including Jamaica (4th), Trinidad & Tobago (9th) Barbados (13th), Canada (18th), Grenada (22nd), Saint Lucia (24th), the United States of America (28th) and Argentina (35th).

Canada

Canada has both men's and women's national teams. One of the top performances of the Canadian women's team was at the 2nd World Youth Netball Championship when they came in third.

United States

Netball began to take off in the United States during the 1970s. The game experienced most of its early growth in the New York area. Local netball associations, including Bronx Netball, Florida Netball Association, American Netball Association of New York State, Texas Netball Association, and Massachusetts State Netball League, were created to help develop and organise the game on a local level during the 1970s and 1980s.

The United States of America Netball Association was created on 23 May 1992 in New York City. IFNA quickly recognised the organisation. As of 2010, the national organisation has affiliates in California, Connecticut, Florida, Georgia, Hawaii, Massachusetts, Maryland, New Jersey, New York, Pennsylvania, Texas, the District of Columbia, Tennessee, Nevada, Washington, Arizona and Virginia. In 1992, the United States of America Netball Association organised the first national championship to be held in the country. The Americans played their first international games at the Netball World Championship in Birmingham, England in 1995, where they won their pool but ultimately finished 14th in the competition. By 2003, the country was ranked 9th in the world. The United States also hosted the 2005 World Youth Championships. But as of January 2011, the country was unranked as its national team had not played enough test matches. The team has suffered because it has to rely on immigration in order to get quality players.

In 2007, Netball America was founded by Steve Anderson, Moreen Logsdon, Jo O'Key, and Sonya Ottaway. Netball America is sanctioned by the United States International University Sports Federation to host the 2nd World University Netball Championship in Miami 2016. Netball America also sent the first team of American Citizens to the inaugural World University Netball Championship in South Africa in 2012.

Jamaica

Netball is the favourite women's sport in Jamaica, where the game was played by 1909. At the time, most of the players were at schools and teachers' training colleges. As the players got older, they expanded the game by creating club sides for casual play. Players were familiar with the English rules as the official Ling Association rule book was sold in the country.
During the 1930s, the major competition was the ISSA Cup. Seven teams competed, including Wolmer's Old Girls Association (W.O.G.A.), St. Andrew, St. Hugh's, Excelsior, Shortwood, and Lincoln. W.O.G.A. built the first hard court to play netball on in Jamaica. Netball is still played at schools in Jamaica. The Queens School won Jamaica's ISSA/Digicel All-Island High Schoolgirls Junior title in 2008, 2009 and 2010. The 2010 title came after the school beat Holmwood Technical 33–20 in the final. Denbigh School won Jamaica's ISSA/Digicel All-Island High School girls Senior title in 2010 for the first time. They played St Hugh's in the final, winning 24–21.

Inception
Pancho Rankine, Margaret Beckford and Margarietta St. Juste created the Jamaica Netball Association in 1958. The organisation became affiliated to the West Indies Netball Board in 1959. They were subsequently invited to have a national team compete in the West Indies Tournament that was held in Montserrat in August 1959. The creation of the Jamaica Netball Association helped spur the growth of club teams and competitions being held at school, church, community, business, club, parish, and national levels. The organisation's founding also helped increase spectatorship.

The early years
In 1960, a member of the All England Netball Association went to Jamaica to coach, lecture and test umpires. Two years later, an English team toured the West Indies, beating Jamaica, Trinidad and the West Indies. In 1967, a team representing Greater London toured Jamaica, winning all their matches on the tour. In 1970, a team of British Students toured the Bahamas and Jamaica. Later that year, Jamaica's national team toured England. The third World Tournament was held in Kingston, Jamaica in 1971. Teams that competed at the event included Jamaica, England and New Zealand. England's record against Jamaica in international matches between 1949 and 1976 was nine wins and zero losses. In 1972, an England Under 21 team toured Jamaica and beat the Jamaican Under 21 team every time they competed. Jamaica's national association was involved in the protests against apartheid policies that discriminated against black South Africans. As a result of the English tour of South Africa in 1973, Jamaica banned players who participated from competing in netball matches held in Jamaica.

2010s
As of January 2011, the women's national team was ranked number four in the world. In 2013, Netball Jamaica became the trading name for The Netball Foundation of Jamaica, a registered company and an approved charitable organisation. This new entity supersedes the Jamaica Netball Association (JNA) and brings with it fundamental changes to how the sport is administered going forward.

References

Bibliography